Filatima transsilvanella is a moth of the family Gelechiidae. It is found in Romania (Transylvania) and Russia (the southern Ural).

References

External links

Moths described in 2001
Filatima
Moths of Europe